The First Berejiklian  ministry was the 96th ministry of the Government of New South Wales, and was led by Gladys Berejiklian, the state's 45th Premier.

The Liberal–National coalition ministry was formed on 23 January 2017, immediately following the resignation of the previous Premier, Mike Baird. Berejiklian and Nationals leader, John Barilaro, were sworn in at Government House, Sydney by Governor David Hurley on the same day.

On 29 January, Premier Berejiklian announced a reorganisation of the ministry, with the full ministry sworn in by the Governor on 30 January 2017.

The ministry covered the period from 23 January 2017 until 23 March 2019 when the 2019 state election was held, resulting in the re-election of the Coalition; with Berejiklian as leader and the Second Berejiklian ministry being formed.

Composition of  ministry

 
Ministers are members of the Legislative Assembly unless otherwise noted.

See also

Members of the New South Wales Legislative Assembly, 2015–2019
Members of the New South Wales Legislative Council, 2015–2019

References

External links
Parliament of New South Wales – Ministers

New South Wales ministries
2017 establishments in Australia
2019 disestablishments in Australia
Ministries established in 2017
Ministries disestablished in 2019